Inge Thomson (born 23 October 1974) is a Scottish singer and multi-instrumentalist.

Born in Fair Isle, Shetland, Scotland, she is a founding member of Harem Scarem and plays accordion and percussion in Karine Polwart's band. She has played with groups including the Broken Family Band in which she recorded on their albums The King Will Build a Disco, Jesus Songs and Cold Water Songs, and was a longtime member of Shetland band Drop the Box. She also regularly collaborates with folk band Lau; her partner is band member Martin Green.

She released her first solo album, Shipwrecks & Static, in 2010, and her second, Da Fishing Hands, in 2015.

References

External links
 Official website

People from Fair Isle
Shetland music
Living people
1974 births
21st-century Scottish women singers
Scottish multi-instrumentalists
Scottish accordionists
Scottish percussionists
Scottish folk musicians
21st-century accordionists